Dimension 5 may refer to:

 Dimension 5 (music group), a Goa trance project from England 
 Dimension 5 (album), a 1981 album by John Lindberg
 Dimension 5 (film), a 1966 science fiction/espionage film

See also 
 Fifth Dimension (disambiguation)